Myrianthus is a genus of flowering plants in the nettle family (Urticaceae). They are mainly found in Tropical Africa. They are mostly tropical trees, shrubs, or lianas. Leaves are simple and pinnately veined or with a palmate structure. It is dioecious, with separate male and female plants.

The leaves of Myrianthus arboreus are an important food source in the Delta and Edo States of Nigeria where the plant is known locally as ujuju. The fruits are also edible.

Species
Although 13 species have been described, there are only four are accepted species:
Myrianthus arboreus
Myrianthus holstii
Myrianthus preussii
Myrianthus serratus

References

External links

Leaf vegetables
Fruits originating in Africa
 
Urticaceae
Urticaceae genera
Dioecious plants